Jaswantnagar is a town and a municipal board in Etawah district in the Indian state of Uttar Pradesh.

Demographics
 India census, Jaswantnagar had a population of 25,346. Males constitute 53% of the population and females 47%. Jaswantnagar has an average literacy rate of 62%, lower than the national average of 65%: male literacy is 68%, and female literacy is 55%. In Jaswantnagar, 17% of the population is under 6 years of age.it has big village dhanuan for 9 km from Jaswant nagar

References

Cities and towns in Etawah district